Albert Vigoleis Thelen (28 September 1903 in Süchteln, Lower Rhine region, Germany - 9 April 1989 in Dülken, Germany) was a German author and translator (from Portuguese).

Life
Thelen was the son of booksellers Louis Thelen and Johanna Scheifes. After the primary school (1909–1913) he attended the Kaiser-Wilhelm-Schule (1913–1918).

Works
Thelen's main work, The Island of Second Sight, which has been praised by many as one of the great achievements in German literature of the 20th century, appeared in 1953. It was soon translated into Spanish and French, later also into Dutch. Not until 2010 when it was published by Galileo Publishing in Cambridge, through the efforts of Isabelle Weiss, was it made available to English readers. The award winning translation by Donald O. White won the 2013 PEN Translation Prize.

References

External links 

 Official website

1903 births
1989 deaths
Officers Crosses of the Order of Merit of the Federal Republic of Germany
German male writers